Robert W. Bailey  (born ) is a politician in Ontario, Canada. He is a Progressive Conservative member of the Legislative Assembly of Ontario representing the riding of Sarnia—Lambton. He has been an MPP since 2007.

Background
Bailey was born in Petrolia, Ontario in the township of Enniskillen. He worked as a contract coordinator for Nova Chemicals in Sarnia. Bailey is also a Freemason.

Politics
Prior to entering provincial politics, Bailey served as a councillor for Enniskillen, Ontario. In 2007 he ran in the 2007 provincial election for the Progressive Conservatives party. He defeated Liberal incumbent Caroline Di Cocco by 3,702 votes. He was re-elected in 2011 and again in 2014.

Bailey has served as critic for a number of areas including Labour and Training. As of 2014 he is the critic for Natural Resources. From 2011 to 2014 he served as Deputy Opposition Whip.

He is serving as the Parliamentary Assistant to the Minister of Government and Consumer Services.

Election record

References

External links
 
 

1951 births
21st-century Canadian politicians
Living people
Progressive Conservative Party of Ontario MPPs